Léonie Geisendorf, née Kaplan (8 April 1914 – 17 March 2016), was a Polish-born, Swedish architect. She lived most of her professional life in Stockholm, Sweden. At the time of her death, she was living in Paris, France.

Education and career
Born in Łódź, Poland, she studied architecture at Eidgenössische Technische Hochschule Zürich followed by an internship with Le Corbusier, who became a source of inspiration and a mentor. In 1938, after her internship, Geisendorf moved to Sweden and was hired by architects Sven Ivar Lind (1902-1980) and Paul Hedqvist (1895-1977). Counting as her first own work is a proposal for a new office building, drawn together with Ralph Erskine and Curt Laudon (1906-1964). 

In 1940, she married Swiss architect Charles-Edouard Geisendorf (1913-1985). 
In 1950 Geisendorf and her husband  started their own architectural firm, L. & C. E. Geisendorf,  in Stockholm with a branch in Zurich.
Together they designed both private and public work.  Notable works include Villa Ranängen at Djursholm (1950-1951),  Villa Delin (1966)  and St. Görans Gymnasium, (1970).

Images

Images, buildings

References

Sources
Geisendorf, Léonie; Gullström Charlie (1990). Arkitektur. Stockholm: Byggförlaget. Libris 7678723. 

Daniel A. Walser, Léonie Geisendorf (1914-2016), Nachruf. In: Werk, bauen + wohnen, Nr. 6, 2016, S. 6

External links

 KulturNav.org
 Obituary - Dagens Nyheter
 "In memoriam" from Dagens Nyheter which gives date of death as March 17.

1914 births
2016 deaths
Swedish centenarians
Architects from Warsaw
Polish women architects
Swedish women architects
Polish emigrants to Sweden
20th-century Swedish architects
21st-century Swedish architects
Women centenarians
Polish centenarians